The Rak is a stream in Inner Carniola, a traditional region of southeastern Slovenia. The confluence of the Rak and the Pivka is one of the largest subterranean confluences in Europe.

References

External links

Rivers of Inner Carniola
Sinking rivers
Articles containing video clips